Smaïl Diss (born 2 December 1976) in Mostaganem is an Algerian former football player.

Honours
 Won the Algerian Cup once with ES Sétif in 2012

National team statistics

References

External links

1976 births
Living people
Algerian footballers
Algeria international footballers
ES Sétif players
USM Blida players
Algerian Ligue Professionnelle 1 players
People from Mostaganem
ES Mostaganem players
2002 African Cup of Nations players
Association football defenders
21st-century Algerian people